Håøya is the main islet in Kulstadholmane, part of Thousand Islands, an island group south of Edgeøya, part of the Svalbard archipelago.

References

 Norwegian Polar Institute Place Names of Svalbard Database

Islands of Svalbard